Severus Sebokht, also Seboukt of Nisibis, was a Syrian scholar and bishop who was born in Nisibis, Syria in 575 and died in 667.

Although little is known about his early life, he was one of the leading figures in Syria in the 7th century. He taught at the Theological School of Nisibis. In 612, he left the post because of a doctrinal dispute with the Syriac Church of the East. He was a member of the Syriac Orthodox Church. He was a resident of the monastery of Qenneshre, which was situated near the banks of the Euphrates. His student Jacob of Edessa (d. 708), the major representative of “Christian Hellenism".

He was a teacher of the philosophy of Aristotle. In 638, he wrote a major treatise on syllogisms. He translated from Persian into Syriac the commentaries on Aristotle of Paul the Persian.

He was perhaps the first Syrian to mention the Indian number system.

He wrote a major treatise on the Astrolabe. His treatise contained 25 chapters and provided detailed explanations of the measurements of the movements of heavenly bodies.

See also 

 History of the Hindu–Arabic numeral system
 Astrolabe
 Paul the Persian

References

External links 
  (PDF version)
 Severus-Sebokht (Encyclopædia Britannica)

7th-century Syriac Orthodox Church bishops
575 births
667 deaths
People from Nusaybin
7th-century astronomers
7th-century mathematicians
7th-century writers
7th-century Byzantine writers
Byzantine astronomers
7th-century Byzantine scientists